Tanya Wexler (born August 6, 1970) is an American film director. She is known for her 2011 feature film Hysteria.

Early life and education
Wexler is the daughter of Chicago real estate developer Jerrold Wexler, and his second wife, Susan Jeanne ( Metzger). She is the niece of cinematographer Haskell Wexler. Her mother has two other daughters, Daryl Hannah and Page Hannah, as well as a son, Donald, from a previous marriage. Wexler's father is Jewish, whereas her mother is Catholic.

She attended Yale University ('92) where she was roommates with actress Bellamy Young. Wexler also holds a Master of Fine Arts degree from Columbia University ('95).

Career
Wexler has directed five feature films: Finding North (1998), Ball in the House (2001), Hysteria (2011), Buffaloed (2019), and Jolt (2021).

Personal life 
Wexler has four children: a son named Jerrold (born 1999) and three daughters named Ella (born 2000), Ruby (born 2003), and Violet (born 2006) with her former wife, Amy Zimmerman. They met while they were both students at Yale University. Wexler and Zimmerman married on May 19, 2004, in Massachusetts, the first U.S. state to issue marriage licenses to same-sex couples.

Filmography
Finding North (1998)
Ball in the House (2001)
Hysteria (2011)
Buffaloed (2019)
Jolt (2021)

See also
 List of female film and television directors
 List of lesbian filmmakers
 List of LGBT-related films directed by women

References

External links

 

20th-century American Jews
American women film directors
Yale University alumni
LGBT film directors
LGBT people from Illinois
1970 births
Living people
People from Chicago
Columbia University School of the Arts alumni
Film directors from Illinois
21st-century American Jews
20th-century American women
21st-century American women